This is a list of sculptures in Herăstrău Park, a park in Bucharest, Romania.


Statues of animals

Statues of people

Romanian myths and stories

References

Herastrau
Parks in Bucharest
Herastrau
Bucharest-related lists
Herastrau